Judo was contested at the 2013 Summer Universiade from 7 to 11 July at the TatNeft Arena in Kazan, Russia.

Medal summary

Medal table

Men's events

Individual

Women's events

Individual

References

External links
 
 2013 Summer Universiade – Judo
 Results book

2013
Universiade
2013 Summer Universiade events
2013 Universiade